Rumatha polingella is a species of snout moth in the genus Rumatha. It was described by Harrison Gray Dyar Jr. in 1906. It is found in North America, including California, Texas and southern Arizona.

The wingspan is 23–34 mm for males and 26–35 mm for females. The palpi, head, thorax, forewings and abdomen are dark fuscous, dusted with white and there is a scattering of pinkish scales among the white scales on the costal area. The hindwings are white and semihyaline.

The larvae feed on Cylindropuntia species, including Cylindropuntia leptocaulis. They are solitary feeders within the stems of their host plant.

References

Moths described in 1906
Phycitinae